Asota antennalis is a moth of the family Erebidae first described by Walter Rothschild in 1897. It is found on Sulawesi and the Sumatra.

The moth has a wingspan of about 61 mm.

References

Asota (moth)
Moths of Indonesia
Moths described in 1897